Nicholas John Armstrong (born 12 September 1975) is a former English first-class cricketer. Armstrong was a left-handed batsman who bowled right-arm medium pace. He was born in Nocton, Lincolnshire.

Armstrong made his debut for Lincolnshire in the 1995 Minor Counties Championship against Cumberland. Armstrong played Minor counties cricket for Lincolnshire from 1995 to 2000, which included 24 Minor Counties Championship matches and 4 MCCA Knockout Trophy matches. In 1996, he made his List A debut against Gloucestershire in the NatWest Trophy. He played 2 further List A matches for Lincolnshire, against Cheshire and the Netherlands, both in the 2000 NatWest Trophy. In his 3 matches, he scored 27 runs and took 5 wickets at an average of 15.00, with best figures of 2/18.

Armstrong later studied at Durham University, where he made appearances for the university side from 1997–1999.

References

External links
Nicholas Armstrong at ESPNcricinfo
Nicholas Armstrong at CricketArchive

1975 births
Living people
People from North Kesteven District
English cricketers
Lincolnshire cricketers
Alumni of Durham University